Felix Ponte is a Peruvian-American former professional tennis player.

Raised in Lima, Ponte was a top ranked Peruvian junior and attended high school in Chicago.

After being drafted into the U.S. Army he was stationed at Dugway Proving Ground and during this time met Brigham Young University head coach Wayne Pearce, who recruited him to the team,. His quickness on court earned him the nickname "The Cat" from his BYU teammates and he was with the squad from 1970 to 1972.

Ponte featured on the professional tennis tour in the 1970s and registered a best singles world ranking of 174.

References

External links
 
 

Year of birth missing (living people)
Living people
Peruvian male tennis players
BYU Cougars men's tennis players
Sportspeople from Lima